Mohammad Hossein Zahedifard (born 16 August 1985) is an Iranian international football referee who has been officiating in the Persian Gulf Pro League for several seasons and has been on the FIFA list since 2015.

Early life 
He was born on 16 August 1985 in Dashtestan, a city near Bushehr. His nickname is Meysam. He holds a master's degree in Telecommunication Electrical Engineering.

Matches 
FIFA World Cup

Honors 
Iranian Referee of the Year: 2019

References

General references

1985 births
Living people
Iranian football referees
People from Dashtestan